Eupithecia burmata is a moth in the family Geometridae that is endemic to Burma.

References

External links

Moths described in 2009
Endemic fauna of Myanmar
Moths of Asia
burmata